Game of Love or The Game of Love may refer to:

Music
The Game of Love (musical), a 1965 British musical by Tom Jones
"Game of Love", a song by Ike & Tina Turner from their 1970 album Workin' Together
Game of Love (album), a 1990 album by Bad Boys Blue
The Game of Love (album), a 2006 album by Elena Paparizou
This Game of Love, album by Vic Damone
"The Game of Love", a song by Daft Punk from their 2013 album Random Access Memories
"The Game of Love" (Santana song), 2002, featuring Michelle Branch
"The Game of Love" (Wayne Fontana and the Mindbenders song), 1965, later covered by multiple artists
"The Game of Love", 1992 single by Tony Hadley

Film 
The Game of Love (1924 film), a German silent film
The Game of Love (1928 film), a German silent film
The Game of Love, English title of Le Blé en herbe

See also
Love Game (disambiguation)